Dolphus Skinner Lynde (July 1, 1833 Antwerp, Jefferson County, New York – June 30, 1902 Canton, St. Lawrence County, New York) was an American politician from New York.

Life
He attended Gouverneur Wesleyan Seminary. Then he became a merchant in Hermon.

He was a member of the New York State Assembly (St. Lawrence Co., 2nd D.) in 1871, 1872, 1873 and 1874.

He was a member of the New York State Senate from 1878 to 1883, sitting in the 101st, 102nd (both 17th D.), 103rd, 104th, 105th and 106th New York State Legislatures (all four 20th D.).

He was buried at the Evergreen Cemetery in Canton.

Sources
 Civil List and Constitutional History of the Colony and State of New York compiled by Edgar Albert Werner (1884; pg. 291 and 372ff)
 The State Government for 1879 by Charles G. Shanks (Weed, Parsons & Co, Albany NY, 1879; pg. 59f)
 Death List of the Week; LYNDE in NYT on July 6, 1902

External links

1833 births
1902 deaths
Republican Party New York (state) state senators
People from Antwerp, New York
People from St. Lawrence County, New York
Republican Party members of the New York State Assembly
19th-century American politicians